Black and White: A Weekly Illustrated Record and Review was a British Victorian-era illustrated weekly periodical founded in 1891 by Charles Norris Williamson.  In 1912, it was incorporated with The Sphere.

History and contributors
Black & White magazine published fiction by Henry James, Bram Stoker, H. G. Wells, Robert Barr, A. E. W. Mason, Jerome K. Jerome and E. Nesbit.  Others who wrote for Black and White included Samuel Bensusan, J. Keighley Snowden, Philip Howard Colomb, Nora Hopper, Henry Dawson Lowry, Robert Wilson Lynd, Theodore Bent, and Barry Pain.  In its first year, Black and White published "A Straggler of '15", a short story by Conan Doyle, and began serializing "The South Seas", a series of letters by Robert Louis Stevenson. May Sinclair published her first short story, "A Study From Life", in the magazine in November 1895.  The periodical carried art by Harry Furniss, Mortimer Menpes, and Richard Caton Woodville; and photography by Horace Nicholls.

Other iterations

The first issue of Black & White Budget appeared on 14 October 1899.  Thereafter, it continued under that name until 30 May 1903, after which it appeared as Black & White Illustrated Budget until 17 June 1905.  There was one more issue on 24 June 1905 under the name Illustrated Budget, at which point it was discontinued.  The weekly provided English readers with coverage of the Anglo-Boer War.

Staff
Oswald Crawfurd was a director of Black and White upon its establishment.  Eden Phillpotts worked as part-time assistant editor in the 1890s, and Arthur Mee worked as an editor in the late 1890s.  The British Library has a complete run of Black and White.  Black & White Budget was  printed and published by W.J.P. Monckton in London.

Gallery

References

External links
 
 
 The British Library collections

Magazines established in 1891
Magazines disestablished in 1912
Defunct literary magazines published in the United Kingdom
Weekly magazines published in the United Kingdom